Daryl Lamont Boston (born January 4, 1963) is an American former Major League Baseball outfielder, and the current first base coach for the Chicago White Sox.

No. 7 overall pick
Boston was drafted by the Chicago White Sox in the first round (seventh overall) of the 1981 Major League Baseball Draft. He batted .265 with 36 home runs and 164 runs batted in over three seasons in the Chisox farm system when he was called up to the majors in early . Batting lead off, Boston went 3-for-5 with a triple, stolen base, two RBIs and two runs scored in his major league debut on May 13. He soon began to struggle, however, and was optioned back to the triple A Denver Zephyrs. He received a September call up, but had just eight hits in 58 at bats. Overall, he batted .169 with three RBIs and no home runs with the White Sox. In Denver, he batted .312 with fifteen home runs and 82 RBIs.

Chicago White Sox
Boston was given the opportunity to win the White Sox starting centerfield job for the  season, but he struggled. He was batting .215 with three home runs and eleven RBIs when he was sent back down to triple A for more grooming. He batted .274 with ten home runs and 36 RBIs in a 63 game stint with the Buffalo Bisons. Upon his return to the Chisox that September, he batted .261 with four RBIs.

During Spring training , he was beat out for the centerfield job by John Cangelosi. On July 23, the Sox traded left fielder Bobby Bonilla to the Pittsburgh Pirates for pitcher José DeLeón. Cangelosi was shifted to left, and Boston, who was batting .303 in 96 games in Buffalo, was called back up to Chicago to take over in center. He batted .266 with 22 RBIs and five home runs, one of which came on October 4 off Bert Blyleven. This was the 50th and last longball Blyleven allowed that year, which is a record for most homers allowed in one year.

He would spend the remainder of his White Sox career as the fourth outfielder. On April 30, the New York Mets selected Boston off of waivers.

New York Mets
The Mets were using Keith Miller, who is an infielder by trade, in centerfield prior to acquiring Boston. Boston immediately took over as the Mets' center fielder. He got off to a slow start (0-for his first-9), but soon began to hit. He went 3-for-4 with his first Mets home run on May 7 to lead the Mets to a 7-1 victory over the Houston Astros. Despite not debuting with the Mets until May 3, his first season as a Met turned out to be the finest season of his career. In a career high 366 at bats, he had a career high 45 RBIs and eighteen stolen bases (19 on the season, including one with the White Sox) while batting .273. Most importantly, he solidified centerfield with a .985 fielding percentage.

During the off season, the Mets signed free agent Vince Coleman to play center with Boston taking on more of a fourth outfielder role. Injuries to Coleman caused him to miss more than half the season, however, and Boston logged 426 innings in center.

During Spring training , an incident from the previous Spring plagued the Mets clubhouse. Boston, Coleman and Dwight Gooden were accused of rape by Cindy Powell, who was also a known associate of a fourth teammate, David Cone. Charges were dropped when Florida State Attorney Bruce Colton cited a lack of corroborating evidence and the nearly year long delay in the Powell's complaint as reasons for the unlikelihood of conviction.

The bulk of Boston's playing time for the 1992 Mets involved subbing for injuries or suspensions of Coleman. Boston batted .249 with eleven home runs, which was third best on the team.

Colorado Rockies
He batted .261 with fourteen home runs and forty RBIs backing up all three outfield positions.

He signed with the New York Yankees for the  season. They were 6.5 games up in the American League East when the player strike ended the season, and ended Boston's chance of making the post season for the first time in his career.

Career statistics

Boston signed a minor league deal with the Florida Marlins for the  season. In eighteen games with the Charlotte Knights, he batted .188 with one home run and two RBIs. He finished the season with the Independent Northern League Thunder Bay Whiskey Jacks, and spent the  season as a player/manager with the Prairie League Regina Cyclones before retiring.

In , Boston was named minor league roving outfield instructor for the White Sox. In 2013, White Sox manager Robin Ventura named Boston the team's first base coach.

Baseball family
Boston's father, Henry, played Negro league baseball with a team called the Cincinnati Tigers. His twin brother, David, was once an outfielder in the Cincinnati Reds organization. His younger brother, D.J., played minor league and Independent League baseball for sixteen years.

References

External links
, or Retrosheet, or The Ultimate Mets Database

1963 births
Living people
African-American baseball coaches
African-American baseball players
Appleton Foxes players
Baseball coaches from Ohio
Baseball players from Cincinnati
Buffalo Bisons (minor league) players
Charlotte Knights players
Chicago White Sox coaches
Chicago White Sox players
Colorado Rockies players
Denver Bears players
Denver Zephyrs players
Gulf Coast White Sox players
Glens Falls White Sox players
Hawaii Islanders players
Major League Baseball first base coaches
Major League Baseball left fielders
Major League Baseball center fielders
New York Mets players
New York Yankees players
Regina Cyclones players
Thunder Bay Whiskey Jacks players
Tiburones de La Guaira players
American expatriate baseball players in Venezuela
Woodward High School (Cincinnati, Ohio) alumni
21st-century African-American people
20th-century African-American sportspeople